Pippa Winslow is an American/British actress, singer and voice artist.

Winslow is originally from the United States. She obtained a BA in Drama from the University of California, Irvine and an MFA from the American Conservatory Theater in San Francisco. After acting in New York and in touring companies, she moved to the United Kingdom in 2001. She plays Blinkie, American socialite and friend to Princess Margaret, in season 3, episodes 1 and 2 of The Crown.  She was a member of the ensemble in the original West End production of Craig Warner's Strangers on a Train, opening 19 November 2013 at the Gielgud Theatre. She portrayed Carlotta in the United Kingdom premiere of Maury Yeston and Arthur Kopit's Phantom.

References

External links
Pippa Winslow homepage

Living people
British actresses
University of California, Irvine alumni
Year of birth missing (living people)